Paraplatyptilia albui is a moth of the family Pterophoridae. It is found in North America, including the type location Echo Lake in Clear Creek County, Colorado.

References

Moths described in 2008
Moths of North America
albui